The William E. Metzger House, also known as Thomas Tate House, is a Queen Anne-style residence in Portal, North Dakota, United States. Built in 1905, it was listed on the National Register of Historic Places in 2007.

It has "elegantly carved and beautifully preserved birdseye maple trim present throughout."

References

Houses in Burke County, North Dakota
Houses completed in 1905
Houses on the National Register of Historic Places in North Dakota
Queen Anne architecture in North Dakota
National Register of Historic Places in Burke County, North Dakota
1905 establishments in North Dakota